As American as Shoofly Pie: The Foodlore and Fakelore of Pennsylvania Dutch Cuisine is a 2013 nonfiction book by William Woys Weaver, published by University of Pennsylvania Press.

Weaver explores authentic Pennsylvania Dutch cuisine, with recipes of such included, and the imitation cuisine served to tourists in Lancaster County, Pennsylvania, of which shoofly pie is in the latter category.

The book includes content about the groundhog lodges (grundsau lodges).

Background
The author did ethnographic and food history works. He conducted interviews with historians, Amish people involved in food preparation, and people who run restaurants. He also consulted historical literature including restaurant menis, recipe books and cookbooks.

Reception
Jennifer Rachel Dutch of York College argued that the exploration of authentic cuisine was the "most important contribution" present in the work.

According to Jennifer Martin of the University of Tulsa, the writing style is "straightforward, journalistic".<

Beth E. Graybill of Dickinson College praised the "fascinating detail" in the book.

References
  - profile page
 
  - At ProQuest

Notes

External links
 As American as Shoofly Pie - Available on Project MUSE

University of Pennsylvania Press books
2013 non-fiction books
Books about Pennsylvania
Pennsylvania Dutch cuisine